Syed Ishtiaq Ahmed Jaffrey (29 March 1939 – 8 July 2020), better known by his stage name Jagdeep, was an Indian actor and comedian who appeared in more than 400 films. He played Soorma Bhopali in Sholay (1975), Machchar in Purana Mandir (1983), Salman Khan's dad in Andaz Apna Apna (1994) and directed the movie Soorma Bhopali, with his character as the protagonist.

Jagdeep started his film career as a child artist extra in B. R. Chopra's Afsana, then went on to do films as a child artist in films like Ab Dilli Door Nahin, K. A. Abbas's Munna, Guru Dutt's Aar Paar, Bimal Roy's Do Bigha Zamin and AVM's Hum Panchhi Ek Daal Ke.

He was launched as a leading man by AVM in the films Bhabhi, Barkha and Bindiya, and went on to do a few more films as a leading man. He established himself as a comedian since the movie Brahmachari. Some hit songs are picturised on him like "Paas baitho tabiyat bahal jayegi" from Punarmilan, "In pyar ki rahon mein" from the same film, "Chal ud ja re Panchhi" and "Chali Chali re Patang", from the superhit movie Bhabhi, where he is paired opposite Nanda, and "Aa Gaye Yaaro Jeene Ke Din" from Phir Wohi Raat.

He is also known for his appearances in many horror movies, especially in projects of the Ramsay Brothers. He appeared in famous hits like Purana Mandir and 3D Saamri. He died at his home in Mumbai on 8 July 2020, following age-related health issues.

Personal life
Jagdeep married three times and was the father of six children. In 1960, he married Sughra Begum. They had two sons, Javed Jaffrey and television producer/director Naved Jaffrey, Naved and Javed were hosts of the dance show Boogie Woogie.

Later, Jagdeep married Nazima. They have one daughter together, Muskaan Jafri.

References

External links
 
 News on Rediff.com

Indian male comedians
Male actors in Hindi cinema
1939 births
2020 deaths
Muslim male comedians
Indian Shia Muslims
Indian male film actors
20th-century Indian male actors
Indian male child actors